Jennifer Hudson is the debut studio album by American singer and actress Jennifer Hudson. It was first released in Australia, and it physically released in North America on September 30, 2008, by Arista and J Records. Hudson worked with several producers and songwriters on the album, including Rock City, Missy Elliott, Brian Kennedy, Ne-Yo, Salaam Remi, T-Pain, Tank, Timbaland and The Underdogs, among others.

Three singles were released; "Spotlight" reached number one on the Billboard Hot R&B/Hip-Hop Songs and in the top 20 on the UK Singles Chart. Jennifer Hudson debuted at number two on the US Billboard 200 and Top R&B/Hip-Hop Albums charts, with first-week sales of 217,000 copies. and was certified gold by the Recording Industry Association of America (RIAA) in the United States.

Hudson promoted the album in numerous live appearances; including co-heading a North American concert tour with Robin Thicke, from March to May 2009. Hudson won three NAACP Image Awards for Outstanding New Artist, Outstanding Album and Outstanding Duo or Group for the album, and was nominated for four Grammy Awards, winning for Best R&B Album. A deluxe edition was released to iTunes on February 24, 2009.

Background
In January 2002, Hudson signed her first recording contract with Righteous Records, a Chicago-based independent record label. In 2004, she was released from her five-year contract so that she could audition for the third season of American Idol in Atlanta. As a finalist, Hudson received the highest number of votes in the Top 9 after her performance of Elton John's "Circle of Life" on April 6, 2004, but two weeks later she was eliminated after performing Barry Manilow's "Weekend in New England", coming in seventh place.

In November 2005, Hudson was cast in the role of Effie White for the film adaptation of the musical Dreamgirls. The filmmakers insisted on casting a relative unknown in the role, paralleling the casting of then-24-year-old Jennifer Holliday in that role for the original Broadway production. 783 singing actresses auditioned for the role of Effie White. Hudson was selected to play Effie, leading Fantasia Barrino to telephone her and jokingly complain that she "stole [Barrino's] part". Her performance earned several prizes, including an Academy Award for Best Supporting Actress, a Golden Globe Award, a BAFTA Award and a Screen Actors Guild Award. Hudson won particular praise for her show-stopping onscreen rendition of the hit song, "And I Am Telling You I'm Not Going", the signature song of the role. Her rendition entered the Billboard Hot 100 at number 98 in the January 13, 2007, issue and was Hudson's first top ten hit on the Billboard Hot Adult R&B Airplay chart on February 24, 2007.

In September 2006, Hudson performed the song "Over It" live on Fox Chicago Morning News. In the interview, she said that the song would be included on her first album, to be released in early 2007; this was before she had been signed to a record label. In late November 2006, it was announced that Hudson has signed a recording contract with J Records, a label of the Sony BMG music conglomerate. Hudson spoke to Access Hollywood at the 2006 A Fine Romance event in Hollywood, exclaiming,: "My album, I'll be recording my album! I just signed my record deal two weeks ago. So I'm starting on that in January."

Release and promotion

Singles
The first single, "Spotlight", written and produced by Ne-Yo and Stargate, was played on US radio on June 9, 2008, and the following day was available as a music download. The song peaked at number twenty-four on the Billboard Hot 100 and at number one on the Billboard Hot R&B/Hip-Hop Songs, spending two consecutive weeks on top. In September 2008, "Spotlight" reached number eleven on the UK Singles Chart and peaked at number one on UK Airplay Chart.

The second single, "If This Isn't Love", was released on February 24, 2009. "My Heart" was originally scheduled as the second single and was due for an October 2008 release, but when her family murders occurred, Hudson rescheduled the release to January 2009. The single was then changed to "If This Isn't Love". On the charts, the track reached number five of the US Billboard Hot R&B/Hip-Hop Songs and the top forty of the UK Singles Chart. "If This Isn't Love" had a second consecutive week at number one on the Urban Adult Radio Charts, Hudson thus joining a group of only five other women in urban adult history to reach this accomplishment.

The third single, "Giving Myself", was sent to US radio on June 2, 2009. It charted on the US Billboard Hot R&B/Hip-Hop Songs at number 84.

Tour

The Spring Tour with Robin Thicke, a tour to promote her album, began on March 31, 2009, in Albany, New York. Due to strain on her vocal cords, Hudson was instructed by her doctor to go on vocal rest, which led to several dates having to be rescheduled.

Tour dates

Critical reception

Jennifer Hudson received mixed reviews from music critics. At Metacritic, which assigns a weighted mean rating out of 100 to reviews from mainstream critics, the album received an average score of 58, based on seven reviews. Mark Edward Nero form About.com commended the album as "generally well-sung and well-produced" and considered it "without a doubt one of the strongest R&B albums of 2008." Sarah Rodman of The Boston Globe found that, "despite its flaws, Hudson's debut comes on much like her Dreamgirls character, with admirable self-assurance and real-girl sensuality." While she felt that the album was "a sometimes illogical jumble that hopscotches from gritty urban soul to glossy adult contemporary pop to the song that clinched her the little gold statue — "And I'm Telling You I'm Not Going." Hudson ties it all together with her titanic vocal prowess and emotional conviction. The Chicago native owns the strong material and elevates the weak [...] The most striking thing about the record, and what ultimately holds it together, is the placement of Hudson's voice front and center in the mix. Billboard named Jennifer Hudson 2008's "best R&B album" and said that Hudson's "self-titled debut showcases a voice so big, with an interpretive talent so natural, that it seems to burst beyond the confines of the recording. Hudson is so comfortable with singing — whatever the song might be — that she elevates the material, making it sound like nothing you've ever heard before. All hail the new diva".

Less enthusiastic, Chris Willman of Entertainment Weekly stated that, "The identity-defying something for everybody mentality yields a Robin Thicke ballad, a Timbaland stomper, some semi-acoustic soul from Stargate, and so on. None are exceptional, but they're all a sufficient delivery system for those spectacular vocal chops." He gave the album a B− rating. Similarly, Greg Kot from Chicago Tribune wrote, "There's no denying the Chicago native is a prodigiously gifted vocalist. But a singer is only as strong as her material, and there's not enough on Jennifer Hudson that measures up to her gutsy, gospel-drenched alto. Hudson's raw ability has been badly mismanaged." New York Daily Newss Jim Farber wrote, that "clearly, Hudson needed the younger stuff to get on radio. Unfortunately, it violates her gift as a twentysomething woman whose voice sounds like it has been there and back. When she calls on that, Hudson comes closest to nailing the dream." Andy Kellman of AllMusic said, "Few vocalists as young as Hudson have a voice that is as versatile and expressive, proficient enough to pull off a multi-dimensional set of R&B songs, yet her debut is as tricked out as that of an artist with a small fraction of the talent. Neither the treatments nor the accessories were necessary."

Accolades
The album received four Grammy Award nominations at the 51st Grammy Awards in 2009 for Best R&B Album, Best R&B Performance by a Duo or Group with Vocals, Best Female R&B Vocal Performance and Best R&B Song for "Spotlight". At the ceremony on February 8, 2009, she performed "You Pulled Me Through" and she won the award for Best R&B Album.

Commercial performance
The album debuted at number two on the Billboard 200 with sales of 217,000 copies sold in the United States. In its second week, the album fell to number 4, with sales of 63,000 copies. On November 7, 2008, the album was certified Gold by RIAA and by 2011 had sold 826,000 copies.

The album peaked at number twenty-one on the UK Albums Chart, and has sold 172,720 copies as of April 2011.

Track listing

Notes
 denotes vocals producer
 denotes co-producer
 denotes additional producer

Charts

Weekly charts

Year-end charts

Certifications

Release history

References

2008 debut albums
Albums produced by Brian Kennedy (record producer)
Albums produced by Jack Splash
Albums produced by Missy Elliott
Albums produced by Polow da Don
Albums produced by Robin Thicke
Albums produced by Salaam Remi
Albums produced by Stargate
Albums produced by Ne-Yo
Albums produced by T-Pain
Albums produced by the Underdogs (production team)
Albums produced by Timbaland
Albums produced by Warryn Campbell
Arista Records albums
Jennifer Hudson albums
Grammy Award for Best R&B Album
J Records albums